Arkadiusz Jerzy "Arek" Onyszko (born 12 January 1974) is a Polish former professional footballer who played as a goalkeeper. He has been coaching goalkeepers in Motor Lublin since July 2017.

Club career
Onyszko was born in Lublin. He began his career in 1989 with KS Lublinianka. In 1998, he moved to Viborg FF from Widzew Łódź, and established himself as Viborg's number one goalkeeper. In 2003, he was transferred to Odense Boldklub, where he spent the next six years as OB's first choice goalkeeper. Between 1998 and 2009, he played 363 games in the Danish Superliga, which makes him the fifth most capped player and the most capped foreigner.

After a turbulent time in Denmark, Onyszko returned to Poland and signed a short-term contract with Odra Wodzislaw on 13 January 2010. The club came last in the league this season and were relegated, but Onyszko's displays were impressive enough to earn him a two-year contract with Polonia Warsaw, which he signed in May 2010. However, in June 2010 Onyszko was diagnosed with kidney failure.

On 6 January 2013, Onyszko had a kidney transplant in Szczecin.

International career
Onyszko was a member of the Poland national team that won the silver medal at the 1992 Summer Olympics in Barcelona, Spain.

Controversies
In June 2009, Onyszko was convicted on charges of assaulting his former wife and sentenced to three months imprisonment, of which two months would be suspended. His club fired him the very same day.

A few days later, he signed a contract with Danish club FC Midtjylland. He was fired on 2 November after the release of his autobiography, which contained attacks on homosexuals and female sport reporters.

In his native Poland, he was criticised for his homophobic statements and for sparking anti-Polish sentiment.

References

External links
 OB profile
 Career statistics at Danmarks Radio
 

1974 births
Living people
Sportspeople from Lublin
Polish footballers
21st-century Polish criminals
Association football goalkeepers
Poland international footballers
Olympic footballers of Poland
Olympic silver medalists for Poland
Olympic medalists in football
Footballers at the 1992 Summer Olympics
Medalists at the 1992 Summer Olympics
KS Lublinianka players
Lech Poznań players
Widzew Łódź players
Polonia Warsaw players
Warta Poznań players
Viborg FF players
FC Midtjylland players
Odense Boldklub players
Ekstraklasa players
Danish Superliga players
Polish expatriate footballers
Polish expatriate sportspeople in Denmark
Expatriate men's footballers in Denmark